Sarukhan is a village in the Gavar Municipality of the Gegharkunik Province of Armenia.

Etymology 
The village was named Sarukhan in honor of the communist activist Hovhannes Sarukhanian (1882-1920). The village was previously known as Dalikardash.

Gallery

References

External links 
 World Gazeteer: Armenia – World-Gazetteer.com
 
 
 

Populated places in Gegharkunik Province